is a book by Japanese doctor and author Junichi Saga (1991).  It recounts a series of stories from the life of his patient Eiji Ijichi, a former Yakuza boss, as told in the last months of his life.

The book starts with the teenage Ijichi running away from his family home in Utsunomiya to Tokyo, to find a judge's mistress who he was having an affair with.  The book follows Ijichi through his first job at a family coal merchant's in the then district of Fukagawa, his various mistresses and treatment for syphilis, the 1923 Great Kantō earthquake, his initiation into the gang that controlled gambling in the Asakusa entertainment area, his various stretches in prison, his overseas service in occupied Korea in the 1920s, his rise to the boss of the gang, and his experiences during and after World War II.

The book paints a colourful picture of life in Japan in the first half of the 20th century, the structure and customs of a yakuza gang, gambling sessions, prison and army life.

The English translation of the book initially was published under the title "THE GAMBLER'S TALE: A Life in Japan's Underworld."

Principal characters 
Eiji Ijichi: A dying Yakuza boss in his 70s, who recounts various stories from his past to his doctor.

Junichi Saga: Ijichi's doctor, who spent many hours with Ijichi over a period of months towards the end of his life, taping his reminiscences.  Saga's main role in the book is to introduce some of the stories with descriptions of the older Ijichi as he recounts them.

Bob Dylan 

It was reported that some lines from Bob Dylan's 2001 album Love and Theft were "borrowed" from the book for songs. 
Some examples appeared in an article published in Journal, which indicated a line from "Floater" ("I'm not quite as cool or forgiving as I sound") was traced to a line in the book, which said "I'm not as cool or forgiving as I might have sounded." Another line from "Floater" is "My old man, he's like some feudal lord." The beginning of the book contains the line "My old man would sit there like a feudal lord."

When informed of the possibility that Dylan had lifted material from the book, author Saga's reaction was to feel honored that Dylan might have read and been inspired by Confessions of a Yakuza.

Dylan has admitted to quoting the lines, but claims that such quotations are done to "enrich" folk and jazz music.

References 

japanese memoirs
1991 non-fiction books
Organized crime memoirs
Works about the Yakuza